was a Japanese basketball player. He competed in the men's tournament at the 1936 Summer Olympics.

References

External links
 

1915 births
Year of death missing
Japanese men's basketball players
Olympic basketball players of Japan
Basketball players at the 1936 Summer Olympics
Place of birth missing